Meidl is a surname. Notable people with the surname include:

Cliff Meidl (born 1966), American sprint kayaker
Radek Meidl (born 1988), Czech ice hockey player
Václav Meidl (born 1986), Czech ice hockey player, brother of Radek

See also
Meidell